Rodden is an unincorporated community located in Elizabeth Township, Jo Daviess County, Illinois,  United States.

History 
Several markers still exist from the town's past including roads and structures. Rodden Road, which intersects with U.S. Route 20, is still in use and can be found just east of the nearby Eagle Ridge Resort & Spa. The abandoned Winston Tunnel is located several miles west of the town. Other markers include the Inn at Irish Hollow, which was partially converted from the old Rodden general store and Post Office.

Present day
Old and newly built structures, residences and farms still exist in the area of Rodden.  Most addresses use ZIP codes from nearby Galena, Elizabeth, and Hanover.

See also 
Galena, Illinois
Elizabeth, Illinois
Hanover, Illinois

Notes 

Unincorporated communities in Illinois
Unincorporated communities in Jo Daviess County, Illinois